Weesaw Township is a civil township of Berrien County in the U.S. state of Michigan. The population was 1,936 at the 2010 census. The township was organized in 1837, and was named after Weesaw, a local Potawatomi chief.

Communities
New Troy is an unincorporated community and census-designated place located on the east branch of the Galien River between sections 7 and 8 of the township. The ZIP code is 49119, and the FIPS place code is 57660.
About 6 miles (9 km) south of Baroda. 9 miles (14 km) northwest of Buchanan. The ZIP code is 49107, and the FIPS place code is 32440. It was founded in 1890 and had a post office from 1891 until 1966. The name "Glendora" was assigned by railroad officials.

Geography

Demographics
As of the census of 2000, there were 2,065 people, 798 households, and 589 families residing in the township. There were 886 housing units at an average density of 24.9 per square mile (9.6/km). The racial makeup of the township was 94.72% White, 0.10% African American, 0.48% Native American, 0.24% Asian, 3.39% from other races, and 1.07% from two or more races. Hispanic or Latino of any race were 4.02% of the population.

There were 798 households, out of which 29.7% had children under the age of 18 living with them, 60.7% were married couples living together, 7.5% had a female householder with no husband present, and 26.1% were non-families. 21.3% of all households were made up of individuals, and 8.4% had someone living alone who was 65 years of age or older.  The average household size was 2.56 and the average family size was 2.95.

In the township the population was spread out, with 23.9% under the age of 18, 7.5% from 18 to 24, 29.6% from 25 to 44, 25.5% from 45 to 64, and 13.5% who were 65 years of age or older.  The median age was 39 years. For every 100 females, there were 103.8 males.  For every 100 females age 18 and over, there were 104.6 males.

The median income for a household in the township was $41,434, and the median income for a family was $45,511. Males had a median income of $34,625 versus $22,083 for females. The per capita income for the township was $18,159.  About 5.0% of families and 6.6% of the population were below the poverty line, including 8.3% of those under age 18 and 6.7% of those age 65 or over.

References

Notes

Sources

External links
Weesaw Township official website

Townships in Berrien County, Michigan
Townships in Michigan